JSC United Engine Corporation is a Russian state-owned company responsible for production of engines for military and civil aviation and space exploration programs. It manufactures power turbines for electricity and heat generation, gas compressor units and marine gas-turbine units.

UEC has created a new version of the PD-14 aviation engine for the next-generation MS-21 aircraft as well as a next-generation military engine for the 5th generation fighter jet, helicopter engines etc. The company has also engineered and introduced to the market new gas-turbine units with a capacity of 60-110 mw.

Compared to other companies of the Rostec group, the financial situation of United Engine Corporation is described as "quite unstable", owing to the considerable amount of debt raised to fund asset purchases.

Structure
Companies included in the group:

 Klimov, Saint-Petersburg (main plant , with close smaller old plant , and new plant and test center at near to north of Lahta locale , a test center in Pskov Tver area .
 Chernyshev Moscow Engineering Plant MMP, Moscow
 Tushino MKB Soyuz
 JSC Kuznetsov OAO Motorostroitel, Samara Oblast
 Kuznetsov Design Bureau , Universalnoe plant , KMPO (Kazan , close to KAPO)
 Aerosila provide propellers fan and other , APU
 NPO Saturn, Yaroslavl Oblast
 Turborus NPO Saturn , Rybinsk
 UEC - Gas Turbines , (north shore northern) Rybinsk Yaroslavl Oblast
 OMKB and OMO named after Baranov Omsk
 Tyumen Motor Plant
 Salyut Machine-Building Association, Moscow (three plants plus outside test plant)
 Naro Fominsk Motor Plant
 AMNTK Sojuz
 Lytkarino Motor Plants (CAGI , CIAM , NPO Saturn , NPO Soyuz MKB Turaevo , UMPO , ODK GT)
 Aviadvigatel, Perm Region
 Perm Motor Plant, Perm Region
 JSC Star, Perm Region
 UMPO
 NPP Motor, Ufa

References

External links
 Official website

 
Rostec
Aircraft engine manufacturers of Russia
Marine engine manufacturers
Gas turbine manufacturers
Aerospace companies of Russia
Engine manufacturers of Russia
Companies based in Moscow
Russian brands